The '90s on 9 (or just The '90s) is the name of Sirius XM Radio's 1990s commercial-free music channel, heard on Sirius XM channel 9 and Dish Network channel 6009. The channel focuses mostly on hit-driven R&B, Hip-Hop, Rock, Dance and Techno tracks from the 1990s. Many of the station IDs are spoofs of movies, TV characters, songs and TV commercials that were popular during the '90s. Occasionally, lesser-known '90s songs are played, preceded by the "five disc CD changer set on random" tagline. The channel's logo features a compact disc in place of the zero, representing the popularity of CDs in the nineties.

History
The service signed on September 25, 2001, and broadcasts on Sirius XM channel 9 and on Dish Network channel 6009. It was also heard on DirecTV until February 9, 2010.  On November 12, 2008, it was added to Sirius, replacing the original Pulse on Sirius channel 9, whereas the new Pulse, formerly Flight 26 was added to channel 12 on the Sirius side. This is Sirius's first all-1990s channel since I-90 signed off on November 4, 2002.  The old Pulse carried a 1990s & hot AC hybrid, whereas the new Pulse just carries modern AC music.  In addition, it also replaced the online-only Super Shuffle channel on Sirius, last heard on satellites in mid-2008.  On February 3, 2014, the channel became jockless when both Jo Jo Morales and KT Harris were let go in a cost-cutting move. It remained jockless until May 26, 2015, when former MTV VJ Downtown Julie Brown, who also hosts the weekend's "Back in the Day Replay Countdown", began hosting the channel on a daily basis.

Core artists
Backstreet Boys
Mariah Carey
Aerosmith
Alanis Morissette
Britney Spears
Nirvana
Green Day
Gin Blossoms
Boyz II Men
Salt-N-Pepa
Will Smith 
Janet Jackson 
Michael Jackson 
LL Cool J
DJ Jazzy Jeff & The Fresh Prince
Tupac
Biggie
En Vogue
TLC

References

External links
SiriusXM: '90s on 9

Sirius XM Radio channels
XM Satellite Radio channels
1990s radio stations in the United States
Sirius Satellite Radio channels
1990s-themed radio stations
Radio stations established in 2001